Southampton BASIC System (SOBS) was a dialect of the BASIC programming language developed for and used on ICT 1900 series computers in the late 1960s and early 1970s; it was implemented as an incremental BASIC interpreter under the MINIMOP operating system at the University of Southampton and also ran under MAXIMOP.

It was operated from a Teletype terminal, though CRT terminals could also be used.

Language characteristics 
In common with many early implementations of BASIC, SOBS needed lines to have line numbers, both to allow a user to add new lines to the program in the desired place and also as targets for GOTO and GOSUB statements. A RENUMBER facility was available to allow for sections of the code to be renumbered, by default in increments of 10, to allow more space in the middle of a program.

Other than line numbers, all numeric values were represented internally as floating point.

Statements 
The language had relatively few statements by comparison with modern programming languages:

Note in particular the lack of a WHILE-like statement; FOR was the only looping construct available to programmers.

Variables 
Variable names for numeric values were either a single letter, or a single letter followed by a single numeric digit, thus allowing for 286 discreet variables in total. Strings were supported; variable names for them had the same restriction but were followed by a pound (£) symbol.

Functions 
A limited number of numeric functions were provided, all of which took one numeric parameter:

Support for strings was more limited, with only one function, LEN, which returned the length of the string parameter. Sub-strings were supported with square brackets, so A£[2,3] referred to the sub-string of the string A£ from the 2nd character to the 3rd character inclusive, so
10 LET A£ = "FOO"
20 PRINT A£[2,3]
would print OO

This syntax was also supported on the left-hand side of an assignment, so
10 LET A£ = "FOO"
20 LET A£[2,2] = "BAR"
30 PRINT A£
would print FBARO

Arrays 
Support for handling arrays of data was relatively strong, with MAT statements able to read an entire array from DATA statements, and perform useful matrix operations such as matrix addition, matrix subtraction, matrix multiplication, and finding the inverse matrix for a square matrix.

Example:
10 DIM A(3,3)
20 MAT READ A
30 DATA 1,1,2,1,0,2,0,2,1
40 DIM B(3,3)
50 MAT READ B
60 DATA 0,0,1,0,1,0,1,0,0
70 DIM C(3,3),D(3,3)
80 MAT C=A*B
90 MAT D=INV(C)
100 MAT PRINT D,

The output would be
2              2              1
1              -1             0
4              -3             -2

Debugging 

SOBS had primitive debugging capabilities, limited mostly to the TRACE statement. TRACE ON would cause the interpreter to print each line number as it was executed.

References

BASIC interpreters
ICL programming languages
Science and technology in Hampshire
University of Southampton
BASIC programming language family